Callegari is an Italian surname. Notable people with the surname include:

Beatrice Callegari (born 1991), Italian synchronized swimmer
Bill Callegari (born 1941), American businessman and civil engineer
Claude Callegari (1962-2021), English YouTuber
Gino Ferrer Callegari (1911–1954), Italian footballer and manager
Giuseppe Callegari (1841–1906), Italian cardinal

See also
Calegari

Italian-language surnames